Sintiki is a municipality in the Serres regional unit, Central Macedonia, Greece. The seat of the municipality is the town Sidirokastro. The municipality has an area of 1,103.431 km2.

Municipality
The municipality was formed after the administrative reform in 2010 (Kallikratis plan) from the merger of the former municipalities of Kerkini, Petrisi and Sidirokastro and the rural municipalities of Angistro, Achladochori and Promachonas. The administrative seat of the municipality is Sidirokastro. The former municipalities and rural municipalities have since formed the six municipal districts. The community is further subdivided into 3 city districts and 23 local communities.

Province
The province of Sintiki was one of the provinces of the Serres Prefecture. Its territory corresponded with that of the current municipality Sintiki, and a small part of the municipality Irakleia. It was abolished in 2006.

References

Municipalities of Central Macedonia
Populated places in Serres (regional unit)
Provinces of Greece